Gallup Catholic School (GCS) was a private, Roman Catholic K-12 in Gallup, New Mexico. It was located in the Roman Catholic Diocese of Gallup. The school colors were green, black, and white.

History
Previously it was operated by the diocese and known as the Sacred Heart Cathedral Elementary and High School. In 1978 the high school division stopped operations. In 1991 it became the Gallup Catholic School and was no longer controlled by the diocese. In May 1997 a new graduating class of the re-established high school graduated. In 1997 the school had a total of 262 students in all grades.

In 2001 Saint Bonaventure Indian School in Thoreau ended its high school program, with its board of directors funding scholarships for students to attend high school classes at Gallup Catholic.

Circa 2008 there were 130 enrolled pupils in the high school.

By 2012 the diocese once again had control of the school. By 2013 high school enrollment was down to 33. Due to declining enrollment, the high school was closed in 2013.  The related elementary school remains open.

Notes and references

External links
  (2011-2012 only)

Defunct Catholic secondary schools in the United States
Gallup, New Mexico
Educational institutions established in 1912
Schools in McKinley County, New Mexico
1912 establishments in New Mexico
Private K-12 schools in the United States